Barbadoes Island may refer to:

 Barbados, a republic in the Lesser Antilles
 Barbadoes Island (Pennsylvania), an island in the Schuylkill River